The 2010 Rugby League Four Nations tournament was played in Australia and New Zealand in October and November 2010. The tournament was the second time the Four Nations had been held, following on from the 2009 edition held in England and France.

The series was contested between Australia, England, New Zealand and the winners of the 2009 Pacific Cup, Papua New Guinea.

Teams

Australia 
Coach:  Tim Sheens

Of the twenty five players, twenty three were Australian born while two were Fijian born.

* Replaced originally selected Jarryd Hayne after he withdrew due to injury.

England 
Coach:  Steve McNamara

All twenty four players were English born.

1 Ruled out of the rest of the tournament after round one due to injury.

2 Replaced originally selected Adrian Morley who was originally selected to captain the squad, but withdrew due to an injury suffered in the pre-tournament match against the New Zealand Māori.; while James Graham was named the team captain.

New Zealand 
Coach:  Stephen Kearney

Of the twenty two players, seventeen were New Zealand born while five were Australian born.

1 Replaced originally selected Fuifui Moimoi who withdrew due to injury.

2 Ruled out of the rest of the tournament after round one due to injury.

Antonio Winterstein and Lewis Brown were included in the squad but not selected to play in any of the tournament's matches.

Papua New Guinea 
Coach:  Stanley Gene

Of the twenty four players, fourteen were Papua New Guinea born while one was Australian born.

* Replaced originally selected Sigfred Gande who withdrew due to injury just hours before the tournament started.

Officials 
Three referees were initially appointed to control matches in the Four Nations:
  Tony Archer (3 matches)
  Shane Rehm (2 matches)
  Richard Silverwood (1 match)
Richard Silverwood suffered a leg injury and missed round two. He was replaced for this round by Australian referee Ben Cummins.

Venues 
The games were played at venues in Australia and New Zealand. The tournament final was played in Brisbane.

Round one

New Zealand vs England 
In the curtain raiser match the Junior Kangaroos defeated the Junior Kiwis 24–16.

Australia vs Papua New Guinea 
In the curtain raiser match Samoa defeated Tonga 22–6.

Round two

New Zealand vs Papua New Guinea 
In the curtain raiser match the Junior Kiwis defeated the Junior Kangaroos 32–20 to square the series 1-all. The Junior Kangaroos were ahead 20–0 at half time.

With the victory, New Zealand retained the Peter Leitch QSM Challenge Trophy.

Australia vs England

Round three

England vs Papua New Guinea

New Zealand vs Australia

Points table

Final

Pre-tournament matches 
Before the series, New Zealand played an additional Test against Samoa. It was the first time the two nations have clashed. England played Cumbria on 3 October as a memorial match for Gary Purdham.
England also faced the New Zealand Māori rugby league team in a curtain raiser to the New Zealand-Samoa test.

Papua New Guinea vs Prime Ministers XIII

Cumbria vs England

Ipswich Centennial XIII v Papua New Guinea

New Zealand Māori v England

New Zealand vs Samoa

Broadcasting details 
The Four Nations was broadcast to over 60 countries worldwide.
 Australia:
 Nine Network – All Kangaroos matches live (except New Zealand vs Australia) plus the final, others delayed
 Fox Sports – Some live and some delayed
 Brunei, Malaysia and Indonesia:
 Astro – All Matches Live
 Fiji, Cook Islands, Marshall Islands, Palau, Tahiti, Vanuatu, Tuvalu, Wallis and Futuna, Tokelau, Marianas, French Polynesia, Kiribati, Nauru, New Caledonia and Guam:
 FijiTV – All Matches Live
 New Zealand:
 Sky Sport – All Matches Live
 Prime – All New Zealand matches delayed
 Niue:
 Broadcasting Corporation of Niue – All Matches Live
 Papua New Guinea:
 EMTV – All Matches Live
 Samoa:
 Samoa Broadcasting Corporation – All Matches Live
 Singapore:
 StarHub – All Matches Live
 Tonga and Solomon Islands:
 Tonga Broadcasting Commission – All Matches Live
 Bosnia, Slovenia, Serbia, Poland, Romania, Hungary and Croatia:
 SportKlub – All Matches Live
 Ireland:
 BSkyB – Live coverage of all matches except NZ v England & Australia v PNG.
 United Kingdom:
 BSkyB – Live coverage of all matches except NZ v England & Australia v PNG.
 BBC – Live coverage of NZ v England & Australia v PNG. All other matches delayed.
 Afghanistan, Chad, Syria, Sudan, Tunisia, Yemen, United Arab Emirates, Djibouti, Egypt, Iran, Iraq, Jordan, Kuwait, Lebanon, Libya, Mauritania, Morocco, Qatar, Oman, Somalia, Saudi Arabia, Bahrain and Algeria
 Orbit Showtime Network – All Matches Live
 Sub-Sahra Region and South Africa
 SuperSport – Coverage of tournament final
 Canada, the United States of America and the Caribbean:
 Fox Soccer Channel – All Matches Live

References

External links 
 Rugby League Four Nations - official website

Rugby League Four Nations
Four Nations
Four Nations
Four Nations
2010
2010
2010 in English rugby league